Thunder Bay Chill Soccer Club is a Canadian soccer team based in Thunder Bay, Ontario, Canada. Founded in 2000, the team plays in USL League Two, the fourth tier of the American Soccer Pyramid.

The team plays its home games at Chapples Park Stadium. The team's colours are white and blue. The club also has a large youth program, with over 2000 youth players.

History
The Thunder Bay Chill were established in 2000 by founder Tony Colistro. They played their first home match on May 27, 2000, against the Wisconsin Rebels, losing 4–0. In 2002, they were named the PDL Organization of the Year.

In 2007, the Chill won their first Heartland Division title. In 2008, the Chill became the first Canadian club to win the PDL National Championship, after the defeated the Laredo Heat in penalty kicks in the final. In 2009, the four Ontario-based PDL teams (Forest City London, Toronto Lynx, Ottawa Fury, and the Chill) created a pre-season round robin tournament called the Victoria Challenge Cup, with the Chill emerging as champions, after winning all three of their matches.

From 2007 to 2013, they won the Heartland Division six times in seven seasons (finishing 2nd in 2009), and qualified for the playoffs ten times in an eleven-year span from 2007 through 2017 (missing only in 2014), as part of a dominant stretch in their history which included a five-year period, where they did not suffer a home loss until 2014. In 2015, they moved their home stadium to Fort Williams Stadium, after splitting the past two seasons between the turf stadium and the natural grass field at Chapples Field. They finished as Central Conference Champions five time over this period, earning them trips to the playoffs Final Four. After their PDL Championship title in 2008, they advanced to the Championship final an additional three times in 2010, 2013, and 2017, but ultimately lost in the finals on each of those occasions.

In 2018, the Chill formed a partnership with English Premier League club West Ham United through Global Image Sports, who are West Ham's North American partnership mechanism.

In 2020, the Chill announced they would not play in the 2020 USL League Two season due to the COVID-19 pandemic, with the league later cancelling the entire season anyways. In 2021, the Chill once again withdrew from the league due to continuing travel restrictions associated with the pandemic (although the league did return to operate a season in 2021).

After a two-year hiatus due to the COVID-19 pandemic, the Chill returned to the league for the 2022 season, also marking their return to newly reconstructed Chapples Park, which previously served as their home field until 2014.

Notable former players
The following players have either played at the professional or international level, either before or after playing for the PDL/USL2 team:

Year-by-year

Honours
Premier Development League
National Champions: 2008
Finalists: 2010, 2013, 2017
Central Conference Champions: 2008, 2010, 2011, 2013, 2017
Heartland Division Champions: 2007, 2008, 2010, 2011, 2012, 2013, 2017
 Victoria Challenge Cup 
Champions: 2009

Head coaches
  Tony Colistro (2000–2014)
  Giovanni Petraglia (2015–present)

Stadiums
 Chapples Park Stadium (2004–2014, 2022–present)
 Fort William Stadium (2000–2003, 2014–2019)

References

2000 establishments in Ontario
Association football clubs established in 2000
USL League Two teams
Soccer clubs in Ontario
Sport in Thunder Bay
United Soccer League teams based in Canada
Expatriated football clubs